Bentalls is a British department store chain with a branch in Kingston upon Thames. The well regarded 'county' department store began as a drapery shop, founded by Frank Bentall in 1867. The company was formerly listed on the London Stock Exchange, but since 2001 has been owned by the private Fenwick group.

History
Bentalls was established in 1867 by Frank Bentall who purchased a drapery shop in Kingston upon Thames. The principal buildings of the Kingston store were completed in 1935 to a design by architect Maurice Webb (son of Sir Aston Webb) and inspired by Wren's design for Hampton Court. The fine stonework on the façade was the work of Eric Gill. Between 1935 and 1976 it was the UK's largest department store outside central London. It became a Grade II listed building in 2011.

The company was floated on the London Stock Exchange in 1946, but the Bentall family retained a controlling interest.

Bentalls established their first branch store in 1947 when the Worthing department store of Bentall & Sons was acquired from family cousins who had decided to retire.
The Worthing business was significantly extended with the purchase of the Jordan & Cook furniture store in later years.
The Ealing department store of Eldred Sayers & Son was acquired in 1950. Mary Lee of Tunbridge Wells was purchased a decade later.
Under the association with Frank Bentall's grandson Rowan Bentall, who was Chairman between 1968-1978, the company expanded with a new purpose-built Bentalls department store opening in Bracknell in 1973.
Further stores were opened in Chatham, Tonbridge and Lakeside. As a result, the group's turnover more than doubled from £14.5 million to £35.1 million.

The company subsequently opened a store in Bristol and closed the stores in Chatham and Tunbridge Wells.

Bentall Centre 

In 1987, work began on a major shopping centre development in Kingston, in collaboration with Norwich Union. The new Bentalls department store opened in July 1990, with the main shopping centre opening two years later in November 1992. The facade of the original store was retained as part of the development.

Recent history 
In 2000, the chain rejected a £27 million offer from its rival Allders. In January 2001, Bentalls sold their loss-making Bristol store which had previously been occupied by John Lewis to rivals House of Fraser for £16.35 million.

In June of that year, the family-owned rival department store chain Fenwick purchased Bentalls for £70.8 million. The Bentall family's shareholding at the time was 38%, with Frank Bentall's great-grandson Edward Bentall being the chairman. The company's turnover was £108.2 million. The chain then consisted of six stores: Bracknell, Ealing, Kingston upon Thames, Lakeside, Tonbridge and Worthing.

Fenwick subsequently sold the Lakeside store to Allders and the leases of the Bentalls sites in Ealing, Tonbridge and Worthing to the Bournemouth based Beales group. The successful stores in Kingston upon Thames and Bracknell were retained. The Bracknell branch was replaced in September 2017 by a new Fenwick store as part of The Lexicon development.

Current operations
Kingston is one of the largest retail centres in the south-east and Bentalls itself is popular among many shoppers. In the days approaching Christmas, Bentalls Kingston is said to take over £1 million per day.

Department store locations
Bracknell (opened 1973; closed 2017 to coincide with the opening a new Fenwick store in the town)
Bristol (opened 1998 in premises previously occupied by John Lewis; sold to House of Fraser in 2001)
Chatham (formerly Edward Bates; acquired 1979; closed 1984)
Ealing (formerly Eldred Sayers & Son; acquired 1950; sold to Beales in 2001)
Kingston upon Thames (founded 1867, moved to present site in 1990, Bentall Centre opened 1992)
Lakeside (opened 1992 in premises previously occupied by Lewis's; sold to Allders in 2001)
Tonbridge (opened 1982; sold to Beales in 2001)
Tunbridge Wells (formerly Mary Lee; acquired 1960; closed 29 July 1995)
Worthing (formerly Bentall & Sons; acquired 1947; sold to Beales in 2001)

In popular culture
Singer Dusty Springfield once worked at Bentalls in Ealing and singer Petula Clark gave her first public performance as a child at Bentalls in Kingston upon Thames.

Bentalls is mentioned by the character Chubb in the Anthony Blunt episode (A Question of Attribution) of the stage play Single Spies by Alan Bennett.

Bentalls features in the Ladybird Books People at Work series, appearing in In A Big Store

Bentalls Wood Street entrance also features in the Ladybird Books People at Work series " The Police". A night time scene where two police constables are arresting what appears to be some burglars.

Gallery

Arms

References

External links
Bentalls Department Stores
Fenwick Department Stores

Department stores of the United Kingdom
Buildings and structures in the Royal Borough of Kingston upon Thames
History of the Royal Borough of Kingston upon Thames
Tourist attractions in the Royal Borough of Kingston upon Thames